The Estherville team was a minor league baseball team based in Estherville, Iowa in 1912. The Estherville team was without a known moniker, common in the era. Estherville played the 1912 season as members of the Independent level Iowa State League, winning the league championship. Estherville hosted home minor league games at Riverside Park.

History
Estherville, Iowa hosted a minor league baseball team in 1912 and captured a championship in their only season of play. The Estherville team was a member of the 1912 Independent level Iowa State League, which was reformed as a five–team league. Other members joining Estherville in the 1912 Iowa State League were Clear Lake Fish Eaters, Emmetsburg (baseball). Fort Dodge Boosters and Mason City Cementmakers.

Estherville finished the 1912 season with a 28–22 record under manager Harry Welch, placing 3rd in the overall Iowa State League final standings. The Iowa State League played a split–season schedule, with the winners of each half meeting in a playoff. Estherville won the second–half after the Fort Dodge Boosters won the first–half . During the season, the Clear Lake Fish Eaters team folded on July 12, with an 11–24 record, leaving the league with four teams. In the overall final regular season standings, Estherville finished 2.5 games behind the 1st place Mason City Cementmakers (38–27), followed by the Fort Dodge Boosters (34–25) and ahead of Emmetsburg (24–38). In the 1912 Iowa State League Finals, Estherville defeated the Fort Dodge Boosters 4 games to 1 in the Finals to capture the championship.

The Iowa State League folded permanently after the 1912 season and Estherville has not hosted another minor league team.

The ballpark
Estherville played 1912 minor league home games at Riverside Park. Riverside Park is still in use as a public park, located along the banks of the Des Moines River. Riverside Park is located on the 100 block of East 1st Street, Estherville, Iowa.

Year–by–year record

Notable alumni
Exact roster information for the 1912 Estherville team is unknown.

References

External links
Baseball Reference

Defunct minor league baseball teams
Professional baseball teams in Iowa
Defunct baseball teams in Iowa
Baseball teams established in 1912
Baseball teams disestablished in 1912
Iowa State League teams
Emmet County, Iowa